An election to Donegal County Council took place on 5 June 2004 as part of that year's Irish local elections. 29 councillors were elected from six electoral divisions by PR-STV voting for a five-year term of office.

Results by party

Results by Electoral Area
 Sitting in italics

Donegal

Glenties

Inishowen

Letterkenny

Milford

Stranorlar

External links
 Official website

2004
2004 Irish local elections